Srimad Virata Parvam is a 1979 Telugu-language Hindu mythological film, produced and directed by N. T. Rama Rao under his Ramakrishna Cine Studios banner. It stars N. T. Rama Rao, Vanisri, Nandamuri Balakrishna  and music composed by Susarla Dakshina Murthy. The film is based on Virata Parva from epic Mahabharata  in which NTR has performed 5 pivotal roles, after blockbuster success of Daana Veera Soora Karna (1977), in which he emoted 3 different roles. It is a color remake of the 1966 movie Nartanasala both starring N.T.Rama Rao as Arjuna.

Plot 
The film begins with Pandavas' triumphs against their 12 exiles and starts the 13th year of Agnathavasam i.e. live incognito under different identities. Here, Lord Krishna advises that the Matsya Kingdom, ruled by Virata is a haven for them. Moreover, his liaison is necessary for the upcoming battle. Besides, he caveats the hindrance of his brother-in-law Kichaka the soulmate of Duryodhana. Right now, Pandavas abides under various forms of disguise Dharma Raju as an advisor Kankubhattu, Bheema as the cook Valala, Nakula as a horse groomsman Damagranthi, and Sahadeva as a cowherd Tantripala. Arjuna by the curse of Urvashi turns into a transgender Brihannala and enrolls as a dance master to princess Uttara. Eventually, Draupadi infiltrates as Sairandhri Malini, a decorator to the queen Sudheshna Devi. Meanwhile, Kichaka returns victorious from the conquest of the Matsya and observes changes in the fort. Parallelly, Duryodhana & Shakuni conspire to knit Lakshmana Kumara with Uttara to gain reinforcement to which Kichaka graciously accords. Knowing it, Pandavas kindles Ghatothkacha to couple up Uttara with Abhimanyu. Just as, he fraternizes Uttara & Abhimanyu, boomerangs the wedding by purporting as Uttara.

All at once, fulminated Kitchaka seeks to strike actuality behind the disappearance of Uttara. Soon, he surmises Pandavas' presence in the kingdom, and excluding Arjuna, he fathoms remaining and Draupadi. At the juncture, Kitchaka affirms Sudheshna, abet of Sairandhri behind the turbulence, and instructs her to send wine through Malini. Thereupon, Kitchaka hails and badly humiliates her in between the court. Due to stipulation, Pandavas persevere patience. Thereafter, they tactically plot by alluring Kichaka through Draupadi and invite him to the dancing hall where Bheema backstabs him. Being cognizant of it, Duryodhana unearths the Pandavas concealed in Matsya. So, they launch an attack on their cattle when all the soldiers are engaged in war. The next day, they attack cattle from another side, immediately, Uttara Kumara swears to fight against them taking Brihannala as his charioteer. However, after watching their troops, he loses his confidence. During that plight, Brihannala volunteers to fight and angles Uttara Kumara to handle the chariot. Before, they move to the Shami tree where the Pandavas' divine weapons are hidden, and procure the Gandeevam when Brihannala regains his original form. At present, Arjuna fires Sammohanastra a smoke weapon, which puts the Kaurava army to sleep, and the cattle are rescued. Parallelly, the 13th year of the Pandavas' Agnathavasam was completed. Finally, the movie ends on a happy note with the marriage of Uttara & Abhimanyu.

Cast 
N. T. Rama Rao as Lord Krishna, Arjuna, Duryodhana, Brihannala & Kichaka (Five roles)
Vanisri as Draupadi
Nandamuri Balakrishna as Abhimanyu
Satyanarayana as Bhima & Ghatotkacha (Dual role)
Prabhakar Reddy as Dharma Raju
Mukkamala as Virata
Mikkilineni as Bhishma
Dhulipala as Shakuni
Rajanala as Drona
Mada as Uttara Kumara
Bhavani as Uttara
Chhaya Devi as Hidimbi
Prabha as Satyabhama
Pushpalatha as Sudeshna
Vijayalalitha as Urvashi

Soundtrack 

Music composed by Susarla Dakshinamurthi. Music released on EMI Columbia Audio Company.

Other 
 VCDs and DVDs on – Universal Videos, SHALIMAR Video Company, Hyderabad

References 

1979 films
Hindu mythological films
Films scored by Susarla Dakshinamurthi
1970s Telugu-language films
Films based on the Mahabharata
Films directed by N. T. Rama Rao